
Takeley is a village and civil parish in the Uttlesford district of Essex, England.

History
A number of theories have arisen over the origin of the village's name. One believes the village's name was a corruption from the "Teg-Ley" of sheep clearing. Another theory is that Takeley is derived from the Saxon lord Taecca, who owned land in Essex and Oxfordshire, the latter of which has a village named Tackley. In more recent times, Takeley is thought to have derived from "settlement next to open forest" in reference to the Forest of Essex.

When Takeley was first recorded by the Normans in 1086–87 its boundaries were approximately 8 miles (13 km) in length, with a total area of 3,000 acres (12 km2). However, since the development of Stansted Airport, it has lost nearly a third of its land.

The previous Cooper's End was demolished and the cargo area of Stansted Airport stands on the ground once occupied by the settlement. The access to and from the airport at Cooper's End was closed briefly in January 1991 but was re-opened in November of that year. Cooper's End roundabout was constructed as part of the new airport, and is just west of the terminal.

Takeley parish church, dating from the 12th century, is dedicated to the Holy Trinity, and was Grade I listed by English Heritage in 1967.

Geography

The village is situated approximately halfway between Bishop's Stortford and Great Dunmow, and on Stane Street, the Roman road from Braughing to Colchester. The A120 road and Stansted Airport is at the north.

Takeley consists of a number of 'Ends' and 'Greens', namely Brewer's End (John le Brewer, 1327), The Street, Smith's Green, Bamber's Green (Bambrose Green, from the Banbury family at Sheering Hall), Molehill Green (Morrell's Green), and Mill End.

Governance
Takeley is part of the electoral ward of Takeley and the Canfields. The population of the ward at the 2021 census was 7,192.

Sport
Takeley has a non-league football club, Takeley Football Club, who play at Station Road. They were members of the Essex Olympian League in 2007–08, and entered the Essex Senior League in 2008–09. The cricket team at Takeley was established .

See also
 The Hundred Parishes

References

External links

Takeley Local History Society

 
Villages in Essex
Civil parishes in Essex
Uttlesford